Parsonsfield is a multi-genre band founded in 2011 in Mansfield, Connecticut. The band consists of Chris Freeman, Antonio Alcorn, Max Shakun, and Erik Hischmann. The original members met while attending the University of Connecticut. The name comes from the town of Parsonsfield, Maine, where they recorded their debut album. The band tours in the USA and Canada from their base in Somerville, Massachusetts.

History

Beginnings 
The band began as an offshoot of the university's folk music club. Chris Freeman, Antonio Alcorn, and others met weekly in the student union to play traditional music. The gatherings were open to anyone, and didn't hold any performances, through a misunderstanding, members of the club were offered an opening set at Toad's Place in New Haven, Connecticut. Freeman and Alcorn put together an impromptu band, and soon recruited music students Harrison Goodale (bass) and Max Shakun (guitar) to continue playing shows. The band was also invited to perform at a band competition at the Podunk Bluegrass Festival in August 2012 where they won fan favorite award. They recorded and sold Cd's in very limited numbers.

Career 
In 2013 the band signed to Signature Sounds Recordings and released their self-titled debut album, Poor Old Shine, produced and recorded by Sam Kassirer (Josh Ritter, Lake Street Dive, Langhorne Slim) in Parsonsfield, Maine. Erik Hischmann, the session drummer hired for the album, joined the band soon after recording was completed.

In July 2014 the band changed its name to Parsonsfield. The following month marked the band's second studio release, Afterparty EP, featuring covers of songs by Mississippi John Hurt, Bert Jansch, and Huey Lewis and the News, as well as traditional songs and one original.

In September 2016 the band released its third studio album, Blooming Through The Black, also produced by Sam Kassirer (Josh Ritter, Lake Street Dive, Langhorne Slim), and recorded in Collinsville, CT in an abandoned axe factory on the banks of the Farmington River.

In March 2018, Parsonsfield released their fourth studio album, WE - produced by Dan Cardinal (Josh Ritter, The Low Anthem, Darlingside) and recorded at Dimension Sound Studios in Boston, MA. This marks their first time recording in a traditional studio. The first single, "Kick Out The Windows" was released in February with a companion video, which premiered by American Songwriter. 

In December 2018, Goodale left the band.  In early 2021, Max and Erik left the band.

Film, television and theater 
In winter 2013, and winter 2014–spring 2015, Parsonsfield wrote and performed an original soundtrack to The Heart of Robin Hood, a theatrical production playing eight shows per week in Cambridge, Winnipeg, and Toronto. After returning from Canada, the band relocated to Leverett, Massachusetts.

In March 2016 Weeds or Wildflowers, track 1 on Poor Old Shine, was featured on AMC's The Walking Dead (Season 6, Episode 12: "Not Tomorrow Yet").

In September 2016, Parsonsfield wrote and performed an original score for the 1922 silent documentary Nanook of the North.

Current Members 
In live performances, members of the band all sing, and often switch instruments and trade places on stage. Besides their primary instruments, various members play saw, synthesizer, glockenspiel, melodica, and auxiliary percussion.
 Chris Freeman – banjo, guitar, pump organ, bass, lead vocals
 Antonio Alcorn – mandolin, banjo, bass, vocals

Previous Members 
 Max Shakun – guitar, pump organ, synthesizer, bass, vocals
 Erik Hischmann – drums, bass, vocals
 Harrison Goodale – bass

Other work 
Hischmann (drums) is credited as assistant engineer for The Beast In Its Tracks (Josh Ritter), Bad Self Portraits (Lake Street Dive), and various other albums including Poor Old Shine.

Discography

Studio albums

Singles

References

External links 
 Official website
 Parsonsfield on Spotify
 Parsonsfield on Facebook

Musical groups established in 2011
American folk musical groups
Rock music groups from Massachusetts
University of Connecticut alumni
Rock music groups from Connecticut
Signature Sounds artists
2011 establishments in Connecticut